The WPA 10-Ball World Championship 2015 was the fourth edition of the WPA World 10-ball Championship, the world championship for the discipline of 10-ball pool. It took place from February 17 to 21, 2015 at the SM City Activity Center in General Santos, Philippines.

Taiwan's Ko Pin-yi won the World Cup by beating Filipino Carlo Biado 11–9 in the final. In the semi-final, Ko defeated his younger brother Ko Ping-chung, whereas Biado won against Spaniard David Alcaide.

Defending champion was Dutchman Huidji See, who won the 2011 event but did not participate in this event.

Filipino boxer Manny Pacquiao successfully campaigned against the WPA to select his hometown, General Santos, as the venue for the event, in which he has already organized several pool-billiards tournaments. The tournament was attended by 128 players from over 20 countries. A total of $200,000 in prize money was distributed, the World Champion received $40,000.

Format
The 128 participating players were divided into 16 groups, in which they competed in a double elimination tournament against each other. The remaining 64 players in each group qualified for the final round played in the knockout system.

Prize money
Below was the advertised prize fund for the event. However, shortly after the event, many players commented that they had not received the full prize funds for the event.

Preliminary round
The preliminary round took place from February 17 to 19.

The following 32 players won once in the preliminary round and lost twice, which means early retirement and places 65 to 96:

The following 32 players lost twice in the preliminary round, which means early retirement and places 97–128.

Knockout round
The final round took place from February 19 to 21.

References

External links
 WPA World 10-Ball Championship 2015 at azbilliards.com

2015
WPA World Ten-ball Championship
WPA World Ten-ball Championship
International sports competitions hosted by the Philippines
February 2015 sports events in the Philippines